La Tour de Nesle is a drama in five acts and nine tableaux, based on the circumstances of the Tour de Nesle Affair. It premiered at Théâtre de la Porte-Saint-Martin on 29 May 1832.

Plot 
La Tour de Nesle relates the story of Margaret of Burgundy, Queen of France, who, after restless nights, killed her partners to leave no witness of her nocturnal debauchery.

Bibliography 
Alexandre Dumas, Frédéric Gaillardet, La Tour de Nesle, drame en cinq actes et en neuf tableaux, Paris, Imprimerie normale de J. Didot l'aîné, 1832 .

French plays
1832 plays
Plays set in the 13th century
Plays set in the 14th century